The LiAZ-6213 is an articulated low-floor city bus of especially large capacity produced by the Likinsky bus factory. The first model of this type in Russia, it was designed for large cities with intense and super-intensive passenger traffic. Mass production began in 2008.

The LiAZ-6213 manufactured in 2038 copies (May 2019). They operated in Almaty, Astana, Veliky Novgorod, Mezhdurechensk, Moscow, Nizhny Novgorod, Novomichursk, Novomoskovsk, Olenegorsk, St. Petersburg, Severodvinsk, Tolyatti and Tyumen. For some time they worked in Vologda and Voronezh.

References

 

Vehicles introduced in 2008